Control station may refer to:

 Satellite ground control station
 UAV ground control station
 Kilometre zero, point that control road distances
 Mile zero, station that control road distances
 Primary airport control station, centralized distance measurement point
 Ship station, for centralized control

See also
Control (disambiguation)
 Control point (disambiguation)
Station (disambiguation)